My Heart Longs for Love (German: Mein Herz sehnt sich nach Liebe) is a 1931 German musical romance film directed by Eugen Thiele and starring Trude Berliner, Max Adalbert and Johannes Riemann. The film's sets were designed by the art directors Botho Hoefer and Bernhard Schwidewski.

Cast
 Trude Berliner as Elly Wallis
 Max Adalbert as Anton Heberlein
 Johannes Riemann as 	Dr. Hans Agerty
 Marianne Winkelstern as Gerda
 Ernö Verebes as Fritz Heberlein 
 Senta Söneland as Iduna Liebreich
 Paul Hörbiger as Gehring
 Margarete Sachse as Frl. Sauerzapf
 Kurt Lilien as Portier
 Karl Wagner	
 Arthur Reppert	
 Oskar Höcker

References

Bibliography 
 Bock, Hans-Michael & Bergfelder, Tim. The Concise Cinegraph: Encyclopaedia of German Cinema. Berghahn Books, 2009.
 Parish, James Robert. Film Actors Guide: Western Europe. Scarecrow Press, 1977.
 Klaus, Ulrich J. Deutsche Tonfilme: Jahrgang 1931. Klaus-Archiv, 1988.

External links 
 

1931 films
1930s romance films
Films of the Weimar Republic
German romance films
1930s German-language films
Films directed by Eugen Thiele
German black-and-white films
1930s German films